VPL or Vpl may refer to:

VPL (brand), an American fashion label 
Vancouver Public Library, public library system in Vancouver, British Columbia
Vaughan Public Libraries, public library system in Vaughan, Ontario
Ventral posterolateral nucleus, a part of the thalamus in the brain
Victorian Premier League, the highest association football league in Victoria, Australia
VPL Research, a company started by Jaron Lanier
Viipuri Province, a former province of Finland
Visible panty line, visible underwear beneath somebody's outer clothing
Visibly pushdown language, a kind of formal language
ViRC Programming Language, a programming interface for Visual IRC
Visual programming language, a style of programming language
Kodak Vericolor II, Type L film